Fist to Fist (Chinese title: Chu ba, UK title: Dragons of Death) is a 1973 Hong Kong martial arts film directed by Jimmy L. Pascual, with John Woo as an assistant director. It was released in the United States by The Cannon Group in September 1973, who re-edited it to a 70-minute runtime and released it under the title "Fist of the Double K", providing the film with a new English dubbed soundtrack.

Cast
 Henry Yu Yung
 Wong Chung-Shun
 Lily Chen Ching
 Jackie Chan (as Chen Yuen Lung)
 Mars
 Yuen Wah
 Danny Chow
 Yuen Wah
 Brandy Yuen
 Yuen Woo Ping
 Stewart Tam Tin
 Shan Kwai
 Lee Ying

See also
 Jackie Chan filmography
 List of Hong Kong films
 List of martial arts films

References

External links

1973 films
Hong Kong martial arts films
Golan-Globus films
1970s Hong Kong films